The 2014 Florida Launch season is the inaugural season for the Launch in Major League Lacrosse in the United States of America.  The Launch will be created from the 23-Man Protected Roster of the now defunct Hamilton Nationals.

Regular season

Schedule

Standings

References

External links
 Team Website

Major League Lacrosse seasons
Florida Launch
Florida Launch season